The ADvTECH Group is a JSE listed company in South Africa (JSE:ADH). ADvTECH operates within the education and recruitment industries in South Africa and the rest of Africa.

ADvTECH is Africa's largest private education provider and the holding company of the Independent Institute of Education which operates tertiary education brands including Vega School, Capsicum Culinary Studio, IIE School of Hospitality & Service Management, Varsity College and Rosebank College.

The group also operates a schools division, under which, brands including Crawford International, Trinityhouse Schools, Abbotts Colleges, Maragon Schools, Centurus Colleges and Junior Colleges operate., and  Makini Schools

The current CEO of the ADvTECH Group is Roy J Douglas

In late 2017 the company discovered a fraud by a financial manager in its schools division.

The schools division has seen a constant growth in both the number of students as well as educational sites over the past three years. The number of sites has grown both organically and through acquisition. As a result, the group has shown a growth in Trading Operating Profit of 15 percent.

References

Education companies of South Africa
Employment agencies of South Africa
Companies listed on the Johannesburg Stock Exchange